The Frank Golden Block, at Brougher and Main Sts. in Tonopah, Nevada is a historic building that was built in 1902.  It was listed on the National Register of Historic Places in 1982.

It was deemed significant "as the first substantial stone commercial building" built in Tonopah, for its association with businessman/banker Frank Golden, and for its architecture.  It was designed and built by George E. Holesworth.  Oddly, it is appreciated partly for its lack of style:  "The building is unique for a large stone commercial structure as it lacks the application of any formal stylistic treatment. The absence of cut and dressed stonework or trim also suggests the lack of
readily available stone craftsmen in Tonopah at the time of its construction."

References 

Tonopah, Nevada
Buildings and structures in Nye County, Nevada
Commercial buildings completed in 1902
Commercial buildings on the National Register of Historic Places in Nevada
National Register of Historic Places in Tonopah, Nevada